William Mason Furrer (born February 5, 1968) is a former American football quarterback in the National Football League for the Chicago Bears, Phoenix Cardinals, Denver Broncos, Houston Oilers, St. Louis Rams, and Jacksonville Jaguars.

High school
Furrer attended Pullman High School, on the Palouse in southeastern Washington, and graduated in 1986.  A baseball player, he did not play organized football until his sophomore year, and was the quarterback on the junior varsity. The next year he was a backup to senior Timm Rosenbach, another future NFL quarterback, and became the starter for the Greyhounds as a senior in the fall of 1985.

College career
As a quarterback with Virginia Tech, Furrer became one of the top quarterbacks in school history and he is currently ranked third on its list of all-time career passing leaders.

Furrer was one of only eight to be named a national recipient of the National Football Foundation and College Hall of Fame Scholar Athlete Award in 1991, his senior year.

NFL Europa career

NFL career
Furrer was selected by the Chicago Bears in the fourth round of the 1992 NFL Draft, the fifth quarterback taken and 107th overall pick. When he was drafted he was quoted as saying "One of my biggest problems will be trying to figure out whether to call Mike Singletary mister or sir."

After football
Furrer was a partner with Tony Boselli and Jeff Novak in IF Marketing & Advertising with offices in Georgetown, Texas and Jacksonville, Florida. Prior to founding IF marketing & advertising, he was Director of Web Technologies for S1 Corporation.

Since 2013 Will has held numerous roles (SVP Product, Marketing, and CMO) at Q2, a financial experience company dedicated to providing digital banking and lending solutions to banks, credit unions, alternative finance, and fintech companies in the U.S. and internationally. Beginning in 2016 Will has served as Q2’s Chief Strategy Officer sharing corporate strategy with customers, prospects, and employees as well as collaborating with a small team on M&A activities. In his nine years at Q2 Will has played a key role in the company’s IPO process, branding, messaging, product strategy, and M&A.

Will is a member of the Virginia Tech Hall of Fame, Fork Union Military Academy Hall of Fame, and currently sits on the board for Virginia Tech’s Apex Center for Entrepreneurship. Will holds a Bachelor of Arts degree in English from Virginia Tech and has served the university in the past in roles on the Alumni Association Board of Directors and Distinguished Alumni Board for English.

Awards
 2015 Virginia Tech Sports Hall of Fame.
 2006, inducted into the Fork Union Military Academy Hall of Fame.
 1987, Pullman High School (Washington): All-league Honors
 1991, National Recipient of the National Football Foundation and College Hall of Fame Scholar Athlete Award, 
 1991, one of seven finalists for the Johnny Unitas Golden Arm Award 
 1991, All-Big East Conference Second-team Selection

Records
 Virginia Tech: Most Pass Completions – 494
 Amsterdam Admirals: Most Passes Attempted in a Season – 368 in 1996

References

External links
IF marketing & advertising
Fork Union Military Academy Hall of Fame

1968 births
American football quarterbacks
Amsterdam Admirals players
Chicago Bears players
Denver Broncos players
Houston Oilers players
Jacksonville Jaguars players
Living people
People from Danville, Pennsylvania
People from Pullman, Washington
Phoenix Cardinals players
St. Louis Rams players
Virginia Tech Hokies football players
Players of American football from Pennsylvania